Amalner railway station serves Amalner city in Jalgaon district in the Indian state of Maharashtra. Its code is AN. It has two platforms. Passenger, MEMU, Express and Superfast trains halt here.

Trains

The following major trains halt at Amalner railway station in both directions:

 12834/33 Howrah–Ahmedabad Superfast Express
 12655/56 Navjeevan Express
 20903/04 Vadodara–Varanasi Mahamana Express
 20905/06 Vadodara–Rewa Mahamana Express
 22937/38 Rajkot–Rewa Superfast Express
 15563/64 Jaynagar–Udhna Antyodaya Express
 22973/74 Gandhidham–Puri Weekly Express
 22947/48 Surat–Bhagalpur Express
 22939/40 Hapa–Bilaspur Superfast Express
 22967/68 Ahmedabad–Allahabad Weekly Superfast Express
 18421/22 Puri–Ajmer Express
 19057/58 Udhna–Banaras Express
 16501/02 Yesvantpur–Ahmedabad Weekly Express
 18405/06 Puri–Ahmedabad Weekly Express
 18401/02 Puri–Okha Dwarka Express
 15559/60 Darbhanga–Ahmedabad Antyodaya Express
 19025/26 Surat–Amravati Express
 19003/04 Khandesh Express
 19045/46 Tapti Ganga Express
 17037/38 Secunderabad–Hisar Express
 17623/24 Hazur Sahib Nanded–Shri Ganganagar Weekly Express
 13425/26 Surat–Malda Town Express

References

Railway stations in Jalgaon district
Mumbai WR railway division